Ravinder or Ravindra is an Indian given name. Notable people with this name include:

 Ravinder Baliala, member of the Haryana Legislative Assembly
 Ravinder Bhalla, American civil rights lawyer, and mayor of Hoboken, New Jersey
 Ravinder Bhogal, restaurateur, food writer, and chef
 Ravinder Bopara, cricketer
 Ravinder Chadha, cricketer
 Ravinder Dhallan, chairman and chief executive officer of Ravgen
 Ravinder Goswami, professor at the department of endocrinology and metabolism at the All India Institute of Medical Sciences, Delhi
 Ravinder Grewal, singer and actor
 Ravinder K. Jain, physicist, and academic from the University of New Mexico
Ravinder Kapoor, film actor popularly known as Goga Kapoor
 Ravinder Khatri, Greco-Roman wrestler
Ravinder Kumar, historian
 Ravinder Kumar, Member of the Legislative Assembly of India
 Ravinder Kumar, serial killer 
Ravinder Kumar Dhir, Air Marshal
 Ravinder Kumar Molhu, member of the 15th and the 16th Legislative assemblies of Uttar Pradesh
Ravinder N. Maini, Indian-born British rheumatologist and professor at Imperial College London
Ravinder Pal Singh, field hockey player
 Ravinder Raina, member of Jammu and Kashmir legislative assembly
 Ravinder Randhawa, British Asian novelist and short story writer
 Ravinder Ravi, contestant on the first season of Indian Idol
Ravinder Senghera, Indian-born former English first-class cricketer 
Ravinder Singh, novelist
Ravinder Singh, footballer
 Ravinder Singh, general
 Ravinder Singh, Greco-Roman wrestler
 Ravinder Singh Brahmpura
 Ravinder Singh Dhull, State Media Penalist, Bhartiya Janta Party
 Ravinder Singh Khaira, javelin thrower
 Ravinder Singh Ravi, former member of the Himachal Pradesh Legislative Assembly
 Ravinder Singh Tut, wrestler who competed in the men's freestyle 62 kg at the 1988 Summer Olympics
 Ravinderpal Singh, Canadian cricketer
Ravindra Kaushik, alleged Indian Research and Analysis Wing (RAW) agent 
Ravindra Kumar Sinha, biologist
Ravindra Kumar Sinha, physicist
Ravindra Jain (1944–2015), an Indian music composer and lyricist
Ravindra Mahajani, an Indian film actor
Ravindra Pushpakumara (b. 1975), a Sri Lankan cricketer
Ravindra Randeniya, a Sri Lankan actor and politician
Ravindra Khattree (b. 1959), an Indian born statistician and professor of statistics at Oakland University
Ravindra Kelekar (1925–2010), a noted Indian writer
Ravindra Jadeja
Paritala Ravindra (1958–2005), a political leader in the Rayalaseema region of Andhra Pradesh, India
Ravindra Mankani (b. 1956), a veteran actor who is noted for his work in many a daily soaps, plays and films
Ravindra Patil (b. 1955), a politician from Jalgaon
Ravindra Prabhat (b. 1969), an Indian poet, writer  & journalist
Ravindra Lakmal (b. 1981), a Sri Lankan cricketer
Ravindra Samaraweera, a Sri Lankan politician and a member of the Parliament of Sri Lanka
Ravindra Mhatre, an Indian diplomat in UK who was kidnapped and later murdered in Birmingham in 1984
Ravindra Svarupa Dasa (William H. Deadwyler, III), a religious leader of the International Society for Krishna Consciousness
Ravindra Varma (d. 2006), Minister for Labour and Parliamentary Affairs in the Morarji Desai Ministry in India
Ravindra Kumar (b. 1959), a political scientist, peace-worker, educationalist and the former Vice-Chancellor of Meerut University
Ravindra Kumar (editor) (b. 1960), Editor and Managing Director of The Statesman, one of India's best-known and oldest newspapers
Ravindra Pinge (1926–2008), a Marathi writer
Gujjula Ravindra Reddy, member of the state parliament of Brandenburg
Ravindra K. Ahuja, a researcher and academic
Rabindranath Tagore

See also
Rabindra Bharati University
Ravindra Bharathi, an auditorium located in Hyderabad, India
 Ravindra Kalakshetra
Ravi (disambiguation)
Indian masculine given names